Big Belt National Forest was established as the Big Belt Forest Reserve by the United States Forest Service in Montana on October 3, 1905  with .  It became a National Forest on March 4, 1907. On July 1, 1908 part of Big Belt was combined with Gallatin National Forest and the remainder with Helena National Forest. The name was discontinued.

See also
 List of forests in Montana

References

External links
A RESOURCE FOR THE HISTORICAL GEOGRAPHY OF THE NATIONAL FOREST SYSTEM OF THE UNITED STATES 
Forest History Society:Listing of the National Forests of the United States Text from Davis, Richard C., ed. Encyclopedia of American Forest and Conservation History. New York: Macmillan Publishing Company for the Forest History Society, 1983. Vol. II, pp. 743-788.

Former National Forests of Montana
1905 establishments in Montana